Charles Floyd may refer to:

 Charles Floyd (explorer) (1782–1804), with Lewis and Clark Expedition
 Charles A. Floyd (1791–1873), U.S. Representative from New York
 Charles M. Floyd (1861–1923), American merchant, manufacturer, and politician
 Charles Murray Floyd (1905–1971), English businessman, surveyor, and politician
 Charles R. Floyd (1881–1945), Texas State Senator, 1917–1929, State Representative, 1945
 Charles Rinaldo Floyd, American military leader
 Pretty Boy Floyd (1904–1934), American bank robber and alleged killer

See also 
 Charles Floyd Hatcher (born 1939), American politician and lawyer